XStream is a Java library to serialize objects to XML (or JSON) and back again.

XStream library

XStream uses reflection to discover the structure of the object graph to serialize at run time, and doesn't require modifications to objects. It can serialize internal fields, including private and final, and supports non-public and inner classes.

Object graph serialization
When serializing an object it serializes the full object graph. Duplicate references encountered in the object-model will be maintained. For example, using the following class CD
package com.thoughtworks.xstream;
public class Cd {
	private String id;

	private Cd bonusCd;

	Cd(String id, Cd bonusCd) {
		this.id = id;
		this.bonusCd = bonusCd;
	}

	Cd(String id) {
		this.id = id;
	}

	public String getId() {
		return id;
	}

	public Cd getBonusCd() {
		return bonusCd;
	}
}
and add some of these object to a list
Cd bj = new Cd("basement_jaxx_singles");
Cd mr = new Cd("maria rita");
		
List<Cd> order = new ArrayList<>();
order.add(mr);
// adds the same cd twice (two references to the same object)
order.add(bj);
order.add(bj);

// adds itself (cycle)
order.add(order);

XStream xstream = new XStream();
xstream.alias("cd", Cd.class);
System.out.println(xstream.toXML(order));
If the above code is executed with XStream's default relative references mode, it will generate the following XML:
<list>
  <cd>
    <id>maria rita</id>
  </cd>
  <cd>
    <id>basement_jaxx_singles</id>
  </cd>
  <cd reference="../cd[2]"/>
  <list reference=".."/>
</list>

XStream is free software, distributed under a permissive, revised BSD-style licence.

Usage 
 Confluence

References

External links 

 Library Home Page

XML software
Java (programming language)
Java platform software
Computer libraries
Free computer programming tools